Ima Shalom (1st century CE) is one of the few women who are named and quoted in the Talmud. She was the wife of Eliezer ben Hurcanus, a prominent Mishnaic sage, and the sister of Rabban Gamaliel II of Yavneh, the first person to lead the Sanhedrin as Nasi after the fall of the Second Temple, which occurred in 70 CE.

Some scholars believe that, like Bruriah, Ima Shalom was the composite of several people.

Ima Shalom is mentioned by name in four traditions. Three of them appear in the Babylonian Talmud (bShabbat 116a, bNedarim 20a-b, bBaba Mezia 59b).

See also 
 Yalta (Talmudic character)

References

1st-century women
Ancient Jewish women
1st-century Jews
Talmud people
Talmudic women